A Queda is a 1976 Brazilian drama film directed by Ruy Guerra and Nelson Xavier. It was entered into the 28th Berlin International Film Festival, where it won the Silver Bear - Special Jury Prize.

Cast
 Nelson Xavier
 Hugo Carvana
 Cosme dos Santos
 Lima Duarte
 Perfeito Fortuna
 Ruy Guerra
 Leina Krespi
 Carlos Eduardo Novaes
 Paulo César Pereio
 Tonico Pereira
 Maria Sílvia

References

External links

1976 films
1976 drama films
1970s Portuguese-language films
Brazilian drama films
Films directed by Ruy Guerra
Films directed by Nelson Xavier
Silver Bear Grand Jury Prize winners